Psammodynastes pictus, the painted mock viper or spotted mock viper, is a species of snake from Southeast Asia.

Distribution
The type locality is Borneo and (erroneously) India. In Borneo this species is found in both Brunei, East Malaysia and Kalimantan. It also occurs in the Malay Peninsula including Singapore and in Sumatra, Belitung, Bangka, Simeulue, and Riau Archipelago (Indonesia).

References

 Günther, A. 1858 Catalogue of Colubrine snakes of the British Museum. London, I - XVI, 1 - 281

Colubrids
Snakes of Southeast Asia
Reptiles of Brunei
Reptiles of Indonesia
Reptiles of Malaysia
Reptiles of Singapore
Fauna of Sumatra
Taxa named by Albert Günther
Reptiles described in 1858
Reptiles of Borneo